Jait Re Jait (English: Win, Win) is 1977 Indian Marathi language film directed by Dr. Jabbar Patel and produced by Usha Mangeshkar and Hridaynath Mangeshkar, under the banner of Mahalakshmi Chitra. The film stars Mohan Agashe and Smita Patil in the lead roles. The film won President's Silver Medal for Best Feature Film in Marathi at the National Film Awards.

It is considered to be one of the greatest musical hits of all time in Marathi cinema.  It is based on a book by G. N. Dandekar. Though the music achieved all-time hit status, the film was a box office disaster.

Plot
Jait re jait is a story that revolves around a tribal caste ‘thakar’nagya the protagonist is a drummer,who develops a passion for being “punyavant”[pure one]while growing up listening to his father,he desperately wants to see the “devimassi”[queen bee]his father in childhood peaked nagyas interest in it unknowingly.a girl who leaves her husband because she didn't like him falls in mad love with nagya,once when nagya was cutting wood in jungle bees attack him,nagya seeks revenge he wants to kill them most importantly the queen bee,the queen bee has some religious role in nagya’s tribe tho nagya being stubborn he sets out to flee away the bees with his wife,he does manage to flew them away but in the process his wife gets killed during the time nagya was attacked and attacked back he didn't play drum but even after fleeing the queen bee away he restlessly picked up the drum and started playing it like a mad man he didn't show a single amount of care for his dead wife.This is a classic paradox, where he succeeds (Jait re jait, means WIN-WIN) in his revenge, but loses his wife

Cast
 Mohan Agashe as Nagya
 Smita Patil as Chindhi
 Nilu Phule as Nagya's father
 Sulabha Deshpande as Nagya's mother
 Siddharth Ray 
 Narayan Pe
 Manjiri Paranjpae
 Meena Arjunwadkar
 Seema Dharmadhikari
 Shriram Ranade
 Chandrakant Kale
 Kamini
 Bal Karve
 Shriram Pendse
 Anant Kulkarni
 Dilip Mangalvedhekar
 Arvind Thakar

Crew
 Story - G. N. Dandekar
 Dialogues - Satish Alekar and Anil Joglekar
 Playback - Lata Mangeshkar, Asha Bhosle, Usha Mangeshkar, Varsha Bhosle, Ravindra Sathe and Chandrakant Kale
 Art - Desai
 Colour - Nivrutri Dalvi
 Make Up - Suresh Basale
 Stills - Rao and Rao
 Assistants:
Music - Amar
Direction - Prasad Subhedar and Shrinivas Bhange
Camera - Rajan Kothari and Rajesh Joshi
 Director of Photography - Binod Pradhan
 Director - Dr. Jabbar Patel

Music
The popular songs of the film are composed by Pt. Hridaynath Mangeshkar, with most of the lyrics by N. D. Mahanor and performed by Lata Mangeshkar, Asha Bhosle, Usha Mangeshkar, Ravindra Sathe and Chandrakant Kale. Poet Arati Prabhu contributed to the lyrics of the song "Me Raat Takli".

Awards
The songs from this film are popular in Maharashtra. The film earned actress Smita Patil and Jabbar Patel Filmfare Awards. Maharashtra State Film Awards for Best Direction was also presented to Patel. The 25th National Film Awards held in April 1978 honoured the film with President's Silver Medal for Best Feature Film in Marathi for; 
The film was shot on locations of Maharashtra in Karnala, Khalapur, Kumbhavali and Thakarwadi in Raigad District. The titles appeared after 15 minutes after the start of the film and the song-mee raat taakli—appeared after 50 minutes after the start of the film.

References

External links

Lyrics of the songs from Jait Re Jait

1977 films
Films directed by Jabbar Patel
1970s Marathi-language films
Films about the caste system in India
Best Marathi Feature Film National Film Award winners
Films scored by Hridaynath Mangeshkar